Baron Poole, of Aldgate in the City of London, is a title in the Peerage of the United Kingdom. It was created on 11 July 1958 for the businessman and Conservative politician Oliver Poole. He had previously served as Member of Parliament for Oswestry and as Chairman of the Conservative Party.  the title is held by his son, the second Baron, who succeeded in 1993.

Barons Poole (1958)
Oliver Brian Sanderson Poole, 1st Baron Poole (1911–1993)
David Charles Poole, 2nd Baron Poole (b. 1945)

The heir apparent and sole heir to the peerage is the present holder's son the Hon. Oliver John Poole (b. 1972)

References

Kidd, Charles, Williamson, David (editors). Debrett's Peerage and Baronetage (1990 edition). New York: St Martin's Press, 1990, 

Baronies in the Peerage of the United Kingdom
Noble titles created in 1958
Noble titles created for UK MPs